Megan Dunn (born 1990/91) is a former president of the UK's National Union of Students who held the post from 2015 to 2016. She had previously been the President of Aberdeen University Students' Association.

Dunn was elected as President of the NUS in April 2015. She sought re-election in April 2016, but was defeated by Malia Bouattia.

Dunn campaigned for the United Kingdom to remain in the European Union in the 2016 referendum, having been appointed to the board of the Britain Stronger in Europe campaign.

References

1990s births
Living people
Presidents of the National Union of Students (United Kingdom)
Alumni of the University of Aberdeen
Place of birth missing (living people)